Lagrida aenea is a species of beetle in the family Cerambycidae. It was described by Hintz in 1919. It is known from Gabon, Cameroon, Equatorial Guinea, the Democratic Republic of the Congo, and Uganda. It feeds on plants such as Triplochiton scleroxylon, Petersianthus macrocarpus, Anonidium mannii, and Anthonotha macrophylla.

Varietas
 Lagrida aenea var. flavescens Breuning, 1939
 Lagrida aenea var. ruficollis Breuning, 1939

References

Crossotini
Beetles described in 1919